Keith Victor Kokkola (May 4, 1949 - September 24, 2004) was a Canadian former professional ice hockey player.

Between 1974 and 1977, Kokkola played 54 games in the World Hockey Association with the Chicago Cougars, Denver Spurs/Ottawa Civics, and Birmingham Bulls.  Before his professional hockey career, Kokkola played college football as a defensive tackle at the University of North Carolina.

References

External links

1949 births
2004 deaths
Birmingham Bulls players
Canadian ice hockey left wingers
Chicago Cougars players
Denver Spurs (WHA) players
Des Moines Capitols players
Erie Blades players
Fort Worth Texans players
Ice hockey people from Ontario
Sportspeople from Windsor, Ontario
Nashville South Stars players
New Haven Nighthawks players
North Carolina Tar Heels football players
Ottawa Civics players
Richmond Wildcats players
San Francisco Shamrocks players
Tucson Rustlers players